Terminator 2 (Super Design Ending-Man BS-500 AS) is a video game console sold in Czech Republic, Slovakia, Poland, Serbia, Croatia, Bulgaria, North Macedonia, Romania, Bosnia and Herzegovina, Albania, Montenegro, Armenia, Georgia, Russia, the Baltic states, Ukraine (as Jippy), India, Pakistan, Iran, Iraq, Algeria, Kenya, Hungary and Italy (as Top Console).  It is a hardware clone of the Nintendo Famicom.

Hardware

Background

This particular Famiclone was hugely popular in Poland, Serbia, North Macedonia, Montenegro, Croatia, Bulgaria, Romania, Pakistan, India, Kenya, Iran and Bosnia, throughout the late 1990s and early 2000s. The system has gained cult status, and was widely available on flea markets and even in some electronic stores. Due to political and economical restraints, the fourth and the fifth generation consoles such as the Sega Mega Drive, SNES, or PlayStation were not immediately available, and after their release, some of them were expensive for the average inhabitant. The third generation remained highly popular, because of high availability and low prices, particularly Terminator 2 which was the one of the most successful Famicom clones. It left a mark in pop culture and 1990s-2000s youth, establishing itself as antonomasia for 8-bit video gaming, to the point of being more popular than the original NES in these regions.

The Terminator 2, like most known Famicom clones, was compatible with 60-pin Famicom cartridges and NES games, which could be played using a special converter. Original Nintendo games were not popular due to their high prices and poor availability (except for the Game Boy which was also pirated in these regions after its release). The majority of the games sold with and for the system were cheap unlicensed copies, manufactured mostly in Russia and China. Games for the Terminator 2 were still widely available in Central and Eastern Europe throughout the 2000s, mostly on street markets and in small toy stores.

Within the Donetsk region, Atlantida Enterprise LTD company sold a Dendy competitor, the Jippy game console, which was a clone of Ending Man. The console also used a mascot similar to Dendy - a similarly dressed hippopotamus named Jippy. It had headphone jacks and switches to activate the "turbo-pause". According to various estimates, 15,000 units were sold, including 5,000 in Moscow, Russia. A TV show Jippy Club was produced on the local Donetsk TV station. The project closed in 1994.

The typical retail set included the system, two detachable controllers (both with "turbo" buttons, which meant 4 buttons in total), a light gun, which also based on the original Nintendo gun accessory except the design, power supply and RF cable. The console had a built-in RF modulator, as well as mono audio and composite video through RCA connectors. The system itself could include built-in games, but most common versions were bundled with cartridges such as "1000000 in 1" or "9999999 in 1", supposedly featuring a million games, only a small number of which actually being separate games and the rest just renamed versions of the latter. Usually these were popular games such as Super Mario Bros. or Duck Hunt. Occasionally they were renamed, possibly in an attempt to avoid lawsuits.

Design 
The Terminator's box art was inspired by the Japanese Sega Mega Drive, using colorful triangles in the background and similar logo writings which was supposed to confuse buyers. The unit itself combines design patterns of both models of the Sega Mega Drive, being similar size and shape to the second model but having characteristic CD-ROM inspired circle around the cartridge slot and blue reset and power buttons inspired by the first model's reset button. Some sets even featured a controller which looked like the original Sega Mega Drive's six button controller.

Pricing
The Terminator 2 consoles were mass-marketed by most of the major and smaller electronic stores. It is difficult to determine an exact price for the system, but in places like Gabrovo, Bulgaria in the mid 90s, one could buy it for the rough equivalent of €10. In Romania in 2015 it cost about €10, and in mid-90s roughly the equivalent of $7–10. In Sarajevo, Bosnia and Herzegovina after the Bosnian war it would cost the equivalent of €15. In Poland it used to cost equivalent of €9 to €15 and the games €1 to €2. In Georgia, in early 2000s it used to cost the equivalent of €6 to €15.
 
From 1998 until 2000, the Terminator 2 console used to cost €15 to €25 in Serbia. A normal price for a copied cartridge was €0.5, part of which were unauthorized "1,000,000 in 1" cartridges, containing several repeating games. In the early 2000s, the Terminator lost popularity in Serbia because of increased availability of new consoles. In 2013, the price of the console was €11 and it was still sold in Chinese shopping malls throughout Serbia.

As of 2020, the console can still be purchased from Chinese online retailers, priced about €20.

Reintroduction 
After the original being discontinued around 2014-2016, in 2019 the console was redesigned and can be purchased from online Chinese retailers, with a new box, occasionally with a generic name like "retro 8 bit tv console" or a more well known name like "terminator 2020". The design remains mostly the same, with the major differences being the size of the blue buttons, being slightly bigger and less tall, the "Ending Man" logo is smaller and spells "Terminator®" with 3 Chinese characters below (in some variations the logo is non-existent), the cartridge remover lever is just aesthetic and not functional like the original, the LED moved from next to the power button to the front center of the console, the controller plug is now a 9-pin (Sega Genesis/Mega Drive plug) connection instead of the 15-pin (Famicom plug) the original Terminator used. Some less noticeable differences include the cover having a hinge (sometimes black, other times blue) while the 90's model had a black slider, the console is now powered by a USB-to-microUSB cable connected to a USB power adaptor, only 2 AV connectors (yellow and white) instead of the 3 (red yellow and white) connectors, the number of vent holes in the back decreased from 20 to 12, some text in the circle around the top of the console was changed or removed and the controllers changed in shape and plug, the shape is more ergonomic but still simplistic with the Ending Man logo printed on, keeping the 4 buttons, select and start and the direction pad, and the plug changed to match the new connector in the console.

The new model is still compatible with the 60-pin Famicom cartridges games.

See also 

 Dendy
 Pegasus

References

External links
 Game System Information
 YouTube video
 YouTube video

Unlicensed Nintendo Entertainment System hardware clones